Iori may refer to:

People 
, famed swordsman from the Edo period of Japan
, Japanese singer and voice actress
, Japanese baseball catcher
, Japanese pornographic (AV) actress
, Russian Japanese racing driver
, Japanese actress, voice actress and singer
, Japanese baseball player
, Japanese motorcycle racer
, Japanese baseball player
Manuel Iori (born 1983), Italian footballer who plays for Serie B side Livorno

Characters 
 Iori Hida (Cody Hida in English dub), a character from Digimon Adventure 02
Iori Yagami, an SNK character in the King of Fighters video games
Iori Minase, a character in the Japanese media franchise The Idolm@ster
Iori Nagase, a character from the anime/manga/light novel series Kokoro Connect
Iori Yoshizuki, one of the main characters from the manga series I"s
Iori Davies, a character in the Welsh language television series Pobol y Cwm
Iori Asahina, a character in the Otome game Brothers Conflict
Iori Shirou, a character from the anime Kill la Kill
Iori Kitahara, the main protagonist in the manga series Grand Blue
Iori Izumi Kamen Rider Ibuki Kamen Rider Hibiki
Iori Utahime, a supporting character in Jujutsu Kaisen
Iori Izumi, a main character in the game and anime franchise IDOLiSH7

Other uses
Iori (river), Azerbaijan and Georgia

Japanese unisex given names
Welsh masculine given names